Neatman is an unincorporated community in Stokes County, North Carolina, United States, approximately 3 miles north-northwest of Germanton.

Unincorporated communities in Stokes County, North Carolina
Unincorporated communities in North Carolina